The 2001 Edmonton municipal election was held on October 15, 2001 to elect a mayor and twelve councilors to sit on Edmonton City Council, nine trustees to sit on the public school board, seven trustees to sit on the separate school board, and seven members of the Capital Health Board of Directors.

This election was the first, and to date only, election in which directors were elected to the boards of Alberta's Regional Health Authorities.  After this election, the provincial government returned to appointing all members of these boards directly.

Voter turnout

There were 172,540 ballots cast out of 489,794 eligible voters, for a voter turnout of 35.2%.

Results

(bold indicates elected, italics indicate incumbent)

Mayor

Councillors

Public school trustees

Separate (Catholic) school trustees

One trustee is elected from each ward, and the non-victorious candidate with the most total votes is also elected.

Capital Health Authority

References
City of Edmonton: Edmonton Elections

October 2001 events in Canada
2001 Alberta municipal elections
2001